"No More (I Can't Stand It)" is a song by German Eurodance project Maxx. It was released in March 1994 as the second single from their debut album, To The Maxximum (1994), and is the follow-up to the project's successful debut single, "Get-A-Way". The singer on the song is Linda Meek after that Samira Besic did not participate further in Maxx, after "Get-A-Way". "No More" peaked at number eight in the United Kingdom and also charted in Canada and Japan.

Critical reception
James Hamilton from British magazine Music Week'''s RM Dance Update described the song as a "fluttery galloper".

Chart performance
"No More (I Can't Stand It)" was very successful on the charts in Europe, proving to be one of the project's biggest hits. It reached the top 10 in Austria, Belgium, Denmark, Finland, Germany, the Netherlands, Norway, Scotland, Sweden and the UK, as well as on the Eurochart Hot 100, reaching number nine. In the UK, it peaked at number eight in its second week on the UK Singles Chart, on 7 August 1994. Additionally, it was a top-20 hit in France, Ireland and Switzerland. Outside Europe, "No More (I Can't Stand It)" reached number three on the RPM'' Dance/Urban chart in Canada and was a top-10 hit in Japan.

Music video

The accompanying music video for "No More (I Can't Stand It)" was directed by Jonathan Bate. It was filmed in Marseille, France and was A-listed on Germany's VIVA.

Track listing

Credits
 Artwork – I-D Büro
 Executive producer – The Hitman
 Lyrics – Dakota O'Neill, Dawhite, Gary Bokoe, George Torpey, The Hitman
 Mixed by – Dee O'Neill (tracks: 1 2 3), George Torpey (tracks: 1, 2, 3)
 Music – Dakota O'Neill, Dawhite, George Torpey, The Hitman (3)
 Photography – B. Kammere
 Producer – The Movement
 Vocals – Linda Meek

Charts

Weekly charts

Year-end charts

Release history

References

External links
 

 

1994 singles
1994 songs
Blow Up singles
English-language German songs
Maxx songs
Music videos directed by Jonathan Bate